Look and Read is a BBC Television programme for primary schools, aimed at improving children's literacy skills. The programme presents fictional stories in a serial format, the first of which was broadcast in 1967 and the most recent in 2004, making it the longest-running nationally broadcast programme for schools in the United Kingdom. The series remains popular among school children. Episodes of Look and Read were sometimes repeated on the CBBC Channel.

History

Background
The first programmes for schools in Britain were broadcast in 1957. Early material was mostly aimed at secondary school pupils and seen as a convenient method of demonstration in subjects such as science and geography. In the early 1960s, there was a lot of interest in the medium as a way of educating children with certain learning difficulties, and in 1962, the BBC produced Television Club which presented stories in a drama serial format. The success of this format made some look into the possibilities of using the technique on programmes for primary school children.

The Merry-Go-Round serials
Claire Chovil, a former teacher and children's radio producer, began to research the possibility of bringing stories to television which would meet teachers' requirements to assist them in providing children with word recognition skills. She persuaded the BBC to allow her to produce two experimental serials for their schools programme Merry-Go-Round. Each episode of the serials would contain a limited vocabulary allowing teachers, who were given notes for the series, to present specific lessons with each episode in mind. The story in each episode was divided into two instalments by a teaching segment which gave the children material to read and animated instructions on how to read it. Following the success of the two serials, "Fishing For Fivers" (1965) and "Tom, Pat and Friday" (1966), Look and Read began production in 1966.

Programme format
Although originally produced for the series Merry-Go-Round, "Bob and Carol Look for Treasure" was broadcast as the first Look and Read story in the spring of 1967. The serial took the format, which the programme would continue for many years, of each episode's story being divided into two instalments with an educational section in the middle to teach children the relevant material. Teachers were also provided with story books, or "pupil pamphlets", for each serial, from which they could provide their pupils the story as well as exercises and games. The plots of the stories were written to appeal to children, initially inspired by adventure serials, and often featured puzzles for the characters to solve using their reading skills, which was also reflected in the material given to pupils. Each serial was also written with a limited vocabulary in mind, each of the keywords paced through the piece a certain number of times so they held a certain relevance above other words. They used Alphakids mostly when words appeared.

During the 1970s the programme began to bring in many new elements for a new generation of viewers.  Popular new educational songs were introduced which would remain until into the 90s as well as the character Wordy (see below). In the 1980s and early 1990s the plots also started to contain contemporary issues such as pollution. Towards the latter part of the 1990s the programme began to steer away from some of the elements of the past by, in some cases, removing songs and combining teaching elements with the story segment of the programme. The producers also began making use of the internet as a teaching aid for the programme, allowing children to access games and material through a dedicated website, although the BBC have since removed the sites due to dwindling use, to the dismay of some teachers.

Wordy
For the 1974 serial "Cloud Burst", the new producer Sue Weeks created the character Wordy. A large orange character, vaguely resembling a 'golfball' type element from a contemporary typewriter of the age, with letters on his body, the character featured in the teaching section of the programme, introducing himself as Mr. Watchword, or "Wordy" for short. The character, voiced by actor Charles Collingwood, knew all about grammar and words and taught how to use and recognise them. With a high-pitched voice and distinctive appearance the character has since become one of the most remembered aspects of the programme, and last appeared in the 1992 story "Sky Hunter II".

Songs
Some of the most memorable moments of the programme were its educational songs. Each story had its own individual theme tune, many of which are well remembered among fans of the programme. Each teaching segment also featured many songs with animations, featuring characters like Dog Detective, which were used regularly over the show's history. Many of the lyrics, such as the 'Clue Song' with Dog Detective, the Karate Chopper and 'Bill the Brickie', were written by Patricia Farrington, who also created the characters. Music for the songs were composed by Paddy Kingsland, Roger Limb and Peter Howell of the BBC Radiophonic Workshop and most of the songs were sung by Derek Griffiths.  Among the most popular were:
"Bill the Brickie", which showed a bricklayer "building" words out of bricks, demonstrating the use of units of words or morphemes.
"The Punctuation Song", which featured Mr. Big, representing capital letters, and Miss Full Stop Lollypop, representing as in her name, full stops.
"I'm An Apostrophe", which demonstrated the various uses of the apostrophe.  It went "I'm an apostrophe, to shorten words you say to me; I'm not a comma, I'm not a full stop, don't put me on the line – I go at the top!"
A popular song was "Magic E", originally written in the mid-70s for Words and Pictures to demonstrate the silent E and the change in pronunciation of preceding vowels – for example: "cap" becomes "cape" with me, "tap" becomes "tape" with me. The song's simple lyrics about changing the words with "magic E" were memorable and simple to learn.

Cult popularity
A retro revival of the programme has made Look and Read the focus of some dedicated websites. Some of the older serials were repeated on the BBC children's channel CBBC as part of the Class TV strand until 2008, when the channel's obligation to show educational programmes was dropped.

A fan account celebrating its success and nostalgic value was set up on Twitter in 2017.

List of Look and Read stories

Look and Read specials

References

External links

Look and Read at Broadcast for Schools

 
1967 British television series debuts
2004 British television series endings
BBC children's television shows
British television shows for schools
British television series with live action and animation
Reading and literacy television series
1960s British children's television series
1970s British children's television series
1980s British children's television series
1990s British children's television series
2000s British children's television series
British children's education television series
English-language television shows